The Super League of Belize was a football organization established in 2006 to manage Belizean football. It had no affiliation with the national federation, the Football Federation of Belize. The league disbanded in 2011 after the merger with the Belize Premier Football League to create a new top league in Belize, the Premier League of Belize.

History 

The Super League got its start in 2005 managing games between Belizean office organizations, called "inter-office". In 2006 the league expanded to include City first division amateurs and Masters' over-35 competitions. Its most recent addition was a league of semipro teams, some formerly affiliated with the Belize Premier Football League, which began play in October 2007.

The League has announced plans for a female and B-division league.

Officials 
The President of the Super League is Michael Blease. The SLB's commissioner is former referee and commentator for the BPFL, Ruperto Vicente.

Members

Teams 2011 
 Cayo South United
 Griga Knights
 Hattieville Monarch
 Orange Walk United
 Paradise Freedom Fighters
 Placencia Assassin
 R.G. City Boys United
 Third World F.C.

Previous Winners
2007: Tex Mar Boys
2008: Valley Renaissance
2009: Tex Mar Boys
2010: City Boys United
2011: Placencia Assassin

See also
 Barrio Fino F.C.
 Texmar United

References

External links
Belize - List of Champions, RSSSF.com

 
Football leagues in Belize
2006 establishments in Belize
Bel
Defunct sports leagues in Belize
Sports leagues established in 2006
2011 disestablishments in Belize
Sports leagues disestablished in 2011